Brett Adams (born 29 December 1976) is an English singer, songwriter and actor. He gained prominence as Noddy in BBC's Byker Grove (a character best remembered for being the first teenage homosexual in a children's drama).

After leaving Byker Grove he went on to perform around the world in boyband Point Break.

Television
Brett played Noddy, one of the main characters who first appeared in the 1990 series of Byker Grove and left in the 1995 series staying for 5 seasons. 

The character is best remembered for being the first teenage homosexual in a children's drama. Brett's portrayal of Noddy and that famous kiss scene (the first ever kiss shared between two men on TV) when Noddy kissed his friend Gary (George Trotter) at the cinema was the first time sexuality and dealing with coming out had been tackled on a children’s show and the moment went down in history. 

After the episode aired in 1994 it was on the news and in the papers and there was a lot of negativity from the British press, but Brett received a lot of letters from youngs boys saying how much it had helped them coming out and not feel alone, Brett said "If my storyline upset 10,000 people but helped one person then I see it as a monumental success.” 

His younger brother Grants Adams also played Ed in Byker Grove.

Music
After Brett Adams and David 'Ollie' Oliver left UK children's TV programme Byker Grove they formed the band Point Break, who were signed to Warner Music and managed by Danielle Barnett, they were looking for a new member and then discovered Declan Bennett and Point Break was formed. 

The band released five singles, four of which made the UK top 20 ("Stand Tough" made it to number 7 in the charts), and an album, which was number one in three countries in South east Asia, including Japan, and made the UK top 40.  

They went on to perform on Top of the Pops.

Their song Stand Tough was used in Australia as the Seven Network's theme for coverage of the AFL in 2000.

Discography

Albums

Singles

External links

Discogs
Attitude Magazine Interview - ‘Byker Grove’ star Brett Adams reflects on show’s historic 1994 gay kiss
Brett's profile on Point Break Japanese fan club
Cant Stop The Pop
Music VF

References 

English singers
English songwriters
English actors